Tüpraş Kırıkkale Oil Refinery is an oil refinery in Kırıkkale, central Turkey. It is owned and operated by Tüpraş, the country's only oil refiner with four refineries.

The refinery became operational in 1986. With its annual crude oil refining capacity of around 5 million tonnes, it is a middle-sized refinery in terms of Mediterranean standards. After its initial construction, the refinery was expanded by adding the units of 
hydrocraking, isomerization, diesel fuel desulfurisation and continuous catalyst regeneration (CCR) reforming. Crude oil is supplied from the Botaş Ceyhan Oil Terminal using the Ceyhan-Kırıkkale Oil Pipeline. The facility has a Nelson complexity index of 6.32.  Its storage capacity is 1.41 million tonnes. It has the country's biggest filling capacity for tank trucks. 865 people are employed in the facility. The refinery serves the regional markets of Ankara Province, Central Anatolia,  eastern Mediterranean and eastern Black Sea regions. In 2015, a total of 3.05 million tonnes diverse petroleum products, such as liquefied petroleum gas (LPG), gasoline, jet fuel (ATF), diesel fuel, asphalt base, were processed.

A new thermal power plant will be built to replace the existing inefficient power station situated close to the refinery. The new power plant will be supplied by oil from the capacity expansion of the refinery.

References

Oil refineries in Turkey
Buildings and structures in Kırıkkale Province
Industrial buildings completed in 1986
Kırıkkale
1986 establishments in Turkey